Hubert Thomas Knox  (1845–1921) was an Irish historian.

He was the third son of Charles Knox of Ballinrobe, who would later be High Sheriff of Mayo in 1860 and was a colonel in the North Mayo Militia.  His great-grandfather was James Cuffe, 1st Baron Tyrawley. His mother was Lady Louisa Browne, sister of George Browne, 3rd Marquess of Sligo.  His eldest brother, Charles Howe Cuff Knox, was High Sheriff of County Mayo in 1873, colonel of the 3rd battalion of the Connaught Rangers and captain of the 8th Hussars.

He studied law at the Middle Temple beginning in 1863 and was called to the bar in 1868.  He served for a time in the Indian Civil Service, at Visakhapatnam, and also in the Nilgiris district.

He was educated at Windlesham House School and Harrow. He wrote several books about Irish history.  He was elected a fellow of the Royal Society of Antiquaries of Ireland in 1896.

Select bibliography

 The De Burgo clans of Galway, Journal of the Galway Archaeological and Historical Society, volume one, ii; The manor of Admekin (Headford) in the thirteenth century, iii, 1900–01
 Notes on the Early History of the Dioceses of Tuam, Killala and Achonry, 1904.
 The History of Mayo to the Close of the Sixteenth Century, 1908.

References

External links
 https://web.archive.org/web/20101129221317/http://shrule.com/_shrule/_display.php?pid=751
 http://www.gahs.info/journal5.htm#01

20th-century Irish historians
People from County Mayo
1845 births
1921 deaths
People educated at Harrow School
People educated at Windlesham House School